Clinton Ryno Swart (born 6 September 1992) is a professional South African rugby union player for Toyota Verblitz in the Top League in Japan. His regular position is fly-half or inside centre.

Career

Youth

Swart played first team rugby for Hoërskool Standerton between 2009 and 2011, resulting in his call-up to the  squad for the Under-18 Craven Week tournament.

In 2011, Swart became involved with the  side that competed in the 2011 Under-19 Provincial Championship. Playing at inside centre, he made five appearances in the competition, scoring one try and kicking three conversions to end with a points tally of 11.

He was also included in the ' Varsity Cup squad in 2014, but failed to make any appearances for the university side.

Falcons

In 2014, Swart made the short move from Pretoria to the East Rand to join the  during the 2014 Currie Cup First Division.

However, his inclusion in the side for the semi-final proved to be controversial, as the  lodged a complaint with the South African Rugby Union regarding Swart's eligibility to play in the match. The Leopards argued that he was only available to the Falcons for the final two matches of the Currie Cup First Division competition and therefore not eligible to play in the Semi-Finals. However, SARU Judicial Officer Rob Stelzner SC, ruled that Swart fulfilled the required eligibility criteria and rejected the complaint.

Griquas

He did not make the final group for the competition, instead representing Griquas in the 2015 Vodacom Cup, where he made six appearances as Griquas reached the quarter final of the competition.

Swart made five appearances for Griquas during the 2015 Currie Cup qualification series. He signed a contract extension with Griquas, committing him to the team until the end of 2017.

References

South African rugby union players
Living people
1992 births
People from Standerton
Rugby union fly-halves
Rugby union centres
Falcons (rugby union) players
Griquas (rugby union) players
Cheetahs (rugby union) players
Toyota Verblitz players
Bulls (rugby union) players
Blue Bulls players
Shizuoka Blue Revs players
Rugby union players from Mpumalanga